William Barkley Cooper (December 16, 1771 – April 27, 1849) was an American farmer and politician from Laurel, in Sussex County, Delaware. He was a member of the Federalist Party, then later the Whig Party, who served in the Delaware General Assembly and as Governor of Delaware.

Early life and family
Cooper was born in Laurel, Delaware, son of Isaac and Comfort Townsend Barkley Cooper. His grandfather, Barkley Townsend, came to Laurel in 1768 from Dorchester County, Maryland and at one time owned nearly the whole area. His father served in the Delaware General Assembly, was a member of the Delaware convention that ratified the U.S. Constitution in 1787, and was a member of the 1792 Delaware Constitutional Convention. His brother, Thomas Cooper, also served in the Delaware General Assembly and was one of the U.S. Representatives from Delaware from 1813 until 1817.

William Cooper married Nancy Jones in 1795, and had one child, William T. After her death, he married Nelly Warren in 1816, and after her death, he married for the third time, Jane Townsend Palmer in 1828. There were no children by either of the later marriages. They lived at the southeast corner of 4th and King Street in Laurel and were members of the Methodist Church. He served as an ensign in the Delaware militia, 5th Company, 9th Regiment, and later was commissioned captain of the 3rd Brigade of the Troop of Horse.

Professional and political career
Cooper was appointed a Justice of the Peace from 1797 until 1805 and was also Sheriff of Sussex County from 1800 until 1812. He served in the state house in the 1816 and 1817 sessions and then again in the 1835/36 session. In 1817 he was appointed as an associate justice of the Court of Common Pleas for Sussex County. He was elected Governor of Delaware in 1840 by defeating Warren Jefferson of Seaford, the Democratic candidate, and served as governor from January 19, 1841 until January 21, 1845. Cooper is noted for complaining to the General Assembly that penal code was antiquated, requiring the governor to issue an excessive number of pardons to properly administer justice according to the standards of the day.

Upon leaving office in 1841, Cooper, in his message, 

congratulates the State that her finances are free from embarrassment, and the surplus remained undiminished, while every demand which had been made on the Treasury had been promptly discharged. The currency, though reduced, was perfectly sound; the credit remained unimpaired, and no imputation or suspicion of fraud or public dishonor rested on the fair fame of the Commonwealth; while every consideration conspired to prove that the people of the State, as far as their condition was affected by the action of the State Government, were still preeminently prosperous and happy.

Death and legacy
Cooper died at his home and is buried in the Old Methodist Cemetery at Laurel on April 27, 1849. His only son, William, went South during the Civil War and, according to some, served in the Confederate Army, was held captive for a time at Fort Delaware, and escaped in 1862. Governor Cooper is remembered "as a man of great force of character; an educated man, being polished in manners with intellectual gifts of a high order and a fascinating conversationalist." Another recalls that,"he was a high tempered man ... and was in the habit of swearing very hard in his angry moments. When reproved, he said he couldn't help it."

Almanac
Until 1831, elections were held the first Tuesday of October. Members of the Delaware General Assembly took office the first Tuesday of January. State representatives had a one-year term. After 1831, elections were held the first Tuesday after November 1 and the terms of state representatives were increased to two years. The governor takes office the third Tuesday of January and has a four-year term.

Notes

References

External links
Delaware’s Governors

1771 births
1849 deaths
Methodists from Delaware
People from Laurel, Delaware
Delaware Federalists
Delaware Whigs
Members of the Delaware House of Representatives
Governors of Delaware
Burials in Sussex County, Delaware
Whig Party state governors of the United States
19th-century American politicians
People of colonial Delaware
Delaware sheriffs